Bernhardt Møller Sørensen (30 November 1908 – 2 July 1958) was a Danish rower. He competed at the 1928 Summer Olympics in Amsterdam with the men's eight where they were eliminated in round two. He rowed with his brother Sigfred Sørensen.

References

1908 births
1958 deaths
Danish male rowers
Olympic rowers of Denmark
Rowers at the 1928 Summer Olympics
Rowers from Copenhagen
European Rowing Championships medalists